Tara Summers (born 19 December 1979) is an English actress.

Summers was educated at Heathfield St Mary's School, in Berkshire. She later attended Brown University, where she graduated with a B.A. in history in 2001. Her grandmother was Fritzi Gordon, an Austrian-born WBF World Grand Master bridge player with four world titles.

Summers has written and starred in a one-woman theatrical show, Gypsy of Chelsea. The play is the story of her childhood, charting her mother's turbulent journey from cocaine addiction to recovery.

She has appeared in several films, including Factory Girl in 2006. In 2007 and 2008, Summers starred on TV as Katie Lloyd on Boston Legal.

Summers was the director in the video for Snow Patrol's 2011 single "Called Out in the Dark". She also appeared in the first half of the first season of The CW's mystery drama series Ringer.  In 2014, she appeared as Leanne Zander in the Fox dramedy series Rake.

Filmography

Film

Television

References

External links
 
 

1979 births
Alumni of the London Academy of Music and Dramatic Art
Brown University alumni
Living people
Actresses from London
People educated at Heathfield School, Ascot
English stage actresses
English film actresses
 English Jews
 English people of Jewish descent
 Jewish English actresses
 Jewish women writers
English television actresses
21st-century English actresses